François Boucher may refer to:

 François Boucher, French painter
 Francois Boucher (art historian), French art historian
 François Boucher (violinist), Canadian violinist